The Feldhauptmann (plural: Feldhauptleute) was a historical military appointment, during the time of the Landsknechte or mercenaries in European warfare, who commanded a Fähnlein, a unit of roughly battalion-size. A literal translation is "field captain".

The commander of a regiment, who initially still commanded his own Fähnlein, was designated as the Obristfeldhauptmann ("senior field captain"), the most senior of the Feldhauptleute in the regiment. Orally this was abbreviated to Obrist, the equivalent of "colonel" (likewise the rank of general arose from Generalobrist.)

Georg von Frundsberg, but later Tilly and Wallenstein as well, were often referred to by their contemporaries as Feldhauptleute. 

In Rome in the Middle Ages there were Feldhauptleute, the so-called capitani. See also Generalkapitän.

Sources 
German dictionary by Jacob and Wilhelm Grimm General 

Military ranks
Generals
Warfare of the Middle Ages
Warfare of the Early Modern period